Chida can refer to the following:

 Chida (surname), a Japanese surname
 Chida, Pakistan, a Pakistani village
 Chaim Yosef David Azulai (1724–1806), also known as the Chida